An adenomere is the functional unit in a developing gland. The glands include the salivary and lacrimal glands. Adenomeres are secretory sublobular units having a centrally located collecting duct that connects with postcapillary venules; and is a structural-functional unit in the gland.

They consist of all the secretory cells that release their products into a single intralobular duct.	

An adenomere is composed of:
 Intercalated ducts: transport saliva to larger ducts.
 Striated ducts: contain a lot of mitochondria responsible for electrolyte and water transport during secretion. Simple, low columnar epithelium line these ducts.
 Glandular cells: synthesize glycoproteins.

See also

 Digestive system

References

Exocrine system